Limnonectes fujianensis (Fujian large-headed frog) is a species of frog in the family Dicroglossidae. It is most closely related to, and formerly confused with Limnonectes kuhlii. Its name refers to the type locality in Fujian province of China. It is also found in Hunan, Zhejiang, and Jiangxi in China as well as in Taiwan. and other sources give a somewhat broader distribution.

Limnonectes fujianensis is a medium-sized frog, males being  and females  snout-vent length. Its natural habitats are moist lowland forests, moist montane forest, rivers, intermittent rivers, swamps, freshwater marshes, intermittent freshwater marshes, open excavations, and canals and ditches.

References

fujianensis
Frogs of China
Amphibians of Taiwan
Taxonomy articles created by Polbot
Amphibians described in 1994